Elections to Cumnock and Doon Valley District Council were held on 5 May 1988, on the same day as the other Scottish local government elections. This was the fifth election to the district council following the local government reforms in the 1970s.

The election used the 10 wards created by the Initial Statutory Reviews of Electoral Arrangements in 1981. Each ward elected one councillor using first-past-the-post voting.

Labour maintained a large majority on the district council after winning eight of the 10 seats although four wards were uncontested after only Labour stood a candidate. Labour's vote share fell by 8.9% as they lost two seats from previous election in 1984. The Social Democratic Party (SDP) won a seat in Cumnock and Doon Valley for the first time and the remaining seat was won by Independent Labour.

Results

Source:

Ward results

Cumnock East

Lugar, Logan and Muirkirk

Cumnock South and Old Cumnock

Cumnock West and Auchinleck

Catrine, Sorn and North Auchinleck

New Cumnock

Dalmellington

Patna and Dalrymple

Drongan, Ochiltree, Rankinston and Stair

Mauchline

References

Cumnock
Cumnock and Doon Valley District Council elections